Forster Mutizwa (born 24 August 1985) is a Zimbabwean former cricketer. He played as a lower middle-order batsman and wicket-keeper.

Playing career
He was first called up to the national team for a tour of Bangladesh, and subsequently made his international debut in a One Day International against Kenya on 27 January 2009. He had featured in a lone Test for Zimbabwe against New Zealand in January 2012. In December 2019, he quit playing cricket to become an umpire.

Umpiring career
On 23 July 2021, he stood in his first Twenty20 International (T20I) match, between Zimbabwe and Bangladesh. On 7 August 2022, he stood in his first One Day International (ODI) match, between Zimbabwe and Bangladesh.

See also
 List of Twenty20 International cricket umpires

References

External links
 Cricinfo

1985 births
Living people
Zimbabwean cricketers
Zimbabwean Twenty20 International cricket umpires
Zimbabwean One Day International cricket umpires
Manicaland cricketers
Mashonaland cricketers
Zimbabwe Test cricketers
Zimbabwe One Day International cricketers
Zimbabwe Twenty20 International cricketers
Cricketers from Harare
Zimbabwean cricket umpires
Wicket-keepers